Tau Andromedae, Latinized from τ Andromedae, is the Bayer designation for a single star in the northern constellation of Andromeda. It has an apparent visual magnitude of +4.94, which is bright enough to be viewed from dark suburban skies. The brightness of this star is diminished by 0.24 in magnitude due to extinction caused by intervening gas and dust. It is drifting closer to the Sun with a radial velocity of −14 km/s.

The spectrum of this star matches a stellar classification of B5 III, with the luminosity class of III indicating that this is a giant star. It is radiating about 851 times the luminosity of the Sun from its photosphere at an effective temperature of 12,670 K. The star is an estimated 217 million years old and is spinning with a high projected rotational velocity of ~74 km/s.

Naming

References

External links
 Image Tau Andromedae

B-type giants
Andromeda (constellation)
Andromedae, Tau
BD+39 0378
Andromedae, 53
010205
007818
0477